A buckler is a small shield used as a companion weapon

It may also refer to:
Buckler, a low alcohol beer brewed by Heineken
Buckler Cars, a British car company of the 1940s–1960s
Buckler (nautical), a portable cover secured over a hawsepipe opening
Buckler (surname), persons surnamed Buckler